Events from the year 1902 in art.

Events
 June – The group Boadicea and Her Daughters (1856–83) by Thomas Thornycroft (died 1885) is cast in bronze and erected on the Victoria Embankment in London.
 July – Cecil and Wilfred Phillips open the Leicester Galleries in Leicester Square, London, for exhibitions of modern British and French art.
 September – Paul Cézanne's final studio, at Les Lauves, commanding a view of Montagne Sainte-Victoire, is completed.
 Early October – Beatrix Potter's first children's book The Tale of Peter Rabbit, with her own colour illustrations (originally published privately a year earlier), is first published in a trade edition by Frederick Warne & Co in London. By the end of the year it sells 28,000 copies.
 Georges Braque begins his studies at the Academie Humbert, where he meets Marie Laurencin and Francis Picabia.
 Charles Robert Ashbee moves his Guild and School of Handicraft to Chipping Campden in the English Cotswolds.
 The studio La Ruche is established in the 15th arrondissement of Paris by the sculptor Alfred Boucher to provide accommodation for impoverished young artists.
 Claude Monet begins his Water Lilies series of paintings in his garden at Giverny.
 Edvard Munch exhibits extensively at this year's Berlin Secession, including the first complete showing of his Frieze of Life series. In October he accidentally shoots himself in the hand in the course of breaking up with Tulla Larsen.
 Christopher Whall completes his first major group of stained glass windows in Gloucester Cathedral, England.

Works

 Helen Allingham – View of Blackdown
 Frank Weston Benson – Eleanor Holding a Shell
 Pierre Bonnard – The Terrasse Children with Black Dog
 Thomas Eakins – Self-portrait
 J. W. Godward
 Ionian Dancing Girl
 An Italian Girl's Head
 Vilhelm Hammershøi – Five Portraits
 Gwen John – Self-Portrait
 Gustav Klimt
 Beethoven Frieze (Secession hall (Austria))
 Beech Grove I
 Emilie Flöge
 Max Liebermann – Terrace at the Restaurant Jacob in Niestedten on the Elbe
 Margaret MacDonald
 Oh ye, all ye that walk in Willowood (gesso panel for Willow Tearooms, Glasgow)
 The Red Rose and the White Rose
 Jacek Malczewski – Angel of Death
 Henri Matisse – Notre-Dame, une fin d'après-midi
 William Orpen – The Chess Players
 Walter Osborne – Tea in the Garden
 Pablo Picasso – Femme aux Bras Croisés
 William Blake Richmond – Hera in the House of Hephaistos
 Auguste Rodin – The Thinker (bronze)
 John Singer Sargent – Lord Ribblesdale
 Rudolf Siemering – Bison (bronze, Berlin)
 Max Slevogt – The Singer Francisco D'Andrade as Don Giovanni in Mozart's Opera ("The White d'Andrade")
 Alfred Stieglitz – photographs
 The Hand of Man
 Spring Showers, The Coach
 Henry Scott Tuke – Ruby, Gold and Malachite
 John William Waterhouse – The Missal
 George Frederic Watts – Physical Energy (original bronze cast, sent to southern Africa)
 Stanisław Wyspiański – Self-portrait

Births

January to June
 January 15 – Paul Kelpe, German-born American painter (died 1985)
 January 19 – David Olère, Polish-born Jewish French painter (died 1985)
 January 30 – Nikolaus Pevsner, German-born British art historian (died 1983)
 February 3 – Dolly Rudeman, Dutch graphic designer (died 1980)
 February 20 – Ansel Adams, American photographer (died 1984)
 February 24 – Nedeljko Gvozdenović, Serbian painter (died 1988)
 February 26 – Jean Bruller, French writer and illustrator (died 1991)
 February 27 – Ľudovít Fulla, Slovak painter, graphic artist, illustrator, stage designer and art teacher (died 1980)
 March 3 – Isabel Bishop, American painter and graphic artist (died 1988)
 March 16 – Lucie Rie, Austrian-born British studio potter (died 1995)
 April 2 – Jan Tschichold, German typographer, book designer, teacher and writer (died 1974)
 April 26 – Isaac Soyer, Russian-born American painter, (died 1981)
 May 24 – Sylvia Daoust, Canadian sculptor (died 2004)
 June 24 – Thea Tewi, German-born American sculptor and lingerie designer (died 1999)

July to December
 August 5 – I. Rice Pereira, American abstract painter and writer (died 1971)
 September 2 – Peter Pitseolak, Inuit photographer, artist and historian (died 1973)
 September 10 – Lee Gatch, American painter and muralist (died 1968)
 September 18 – Peter S. Pezzati, American portrait painter (died 1993)
 September 28 – Kenzo Okada, Japanese-born painter (died 1982)
 October 10 – Dick Ket, Dutch magic realist painter (died 1940)
 October 20 – Enid Marx, English textile designer (died 1998)
 November 4 – Pierre Edouard Leopold Verger, French photographer and ethnographer (died 1996)
 November 11 – Ernő Goldfinger, Hungarian-born architect and furniture designer (died 1987)
 November 21 – Marko Čelebonović, Serbian painter (died 1986)
 December 8 – Wifredo Lam, Cuban artist (died 1982)

Undated
 Situ Qiao, Chinese painter (died 1958)

Deaths
 January 6 – Lars Hertervig, Norwegian painter (b. 1830)
 February 7 – Thomas Sidney Cooper, English painter of farm scenes (b. 1803)
 February 18 – Albert Bierstadt, German American landscape painter (b. 1830)
 March 21 – Vincenzo Cabianca, Italian painter (b. 1827)
 April 12 – Ernest Gambart, Belgian-born English art dealer (b. 1814)
 April 15 – Jules Dalou, French sculptor (b. 1838)
 May 20 – Matthew Ridley Corbet, English neoclassical painter (b. 1850)
 June 11 – Otto Eckmann, German painter and graphic artist (b. 1865)
 August 8
 James Tissot, French-born painter (b. 1836)
 John Henry Twachtman, American impressionist landscape painter and member of the Cos Cob Art Colony (b. 1853)
 October 16 – Jeronimo Suñol, Spanish sculptor (b. 1839)
 December 7 – Thomas Nast, German American cartoonist (b. 1840)

References

 
Years of the 20th century in art
1900s in art